Ulzana ( – 1909, also known as Josanni, Jolsanie or Ozaní’ – ″Tanned buckskin″ or Bį-sópàn – ″Big Buckskin″), was a Tsokanende Apache war chief, brother of Chihuahua.

Biography 
Both the brothers were loyal and warlike supporters and lieutenants of Cochise. Ulzana is best known for leading a raid in 1885 (which inspired the film Ulzana's Raid (1972)) through Arizona and New Mexico with only 11 Mogollon warriors, riding 1200 miles, killing 36 Pindah and Mexicans, terrifying settlers, cowboys and miners, stealing stock, and making fun of 2000 soldiers. He lost only one warrior, killed by San Carlos Apache, and went safely to Mexico in the last days of December. Ulzana surrendered, along with his brother Chihuahua and old Nana, on 3 March 1886, when 77 Apache (15 warriors, 33 women, and 29 children) made their entrance into Fort Bowie. Restrained on the reservation, Ulzana survived until 1909.

Movies 
 Ulzana's Raid (1972)
 Apachen (1973)
 Ulzana (film) a 1974 East German western film shot in Romania and Uzbekistan with Gojko Mitic.

References

Apache people
19th-century Native Americans
Year of birth uncertain
1909 deaths